Hilldale railway station is located on the Hunter Line in New South Wales, Australia opening on 14 August 1911. Originally a full-length platform, it was later replaced by the present short platform. It serves the rural locality of the same name. It is serviced by NSW TrainLink Hunter line services travelling between Newcastle and Dungog.

Platforms & services
Hilldale consists of a single wooden and concrete platform about three metres long. It is serviced by NSW TrainLink Hunter line services travelling between Newcastle and Dungog. There are five services in each direction on weekdays, with three on weekends and public holidays. It is a request stop with passengers required to notify the guard if they wish to alight and 'flag' the train down if they wish to board.

References

External links
Hilldale station details Transport for New South Wales

Railway stations in the Hunter Region
Railway stations in Australia opened in 1911
Regional railway stations in New South Wales
Short-platform railway stations in New South Wales, 1 car or less